The 2014 Rakuten Japan Open Tennis Championships was a men's tennis tournament played on outdoor hard courts. It was the 41st edition of the event known this year as the Rakuten Japan Open Tennis Championships, and part of the 500 Series of the 2014 ATP World Tour. It was held at the Ariake Coliseum in Tokyo, Japan, from September 29 till October 5, 2014.

Points and prize money

Point distribution

Prize money

Singles main-draw entrants

Seeds

 1 Rankings are as of September 22, 2014.

Other entrants
The following players received wildcards into the singles main draw:
  Taro Daniel
  Tatsuma Ito
  Go Soeda

The following players received entry from the qualifying draw:
  Pierre-Hugues Herbert
  Hiroki Moriya
  Michał Przysiężny
  Rajeev Ram

Withdrawals
Before the tournament
  Juan Martín del Potro (wrist injury)
  Lleyton Hewitt
  Gaël Monfils
  Benoît Paire
  Radek Štěpánek

Retirements
  Roberto Bautista Agut (quad strain)
  Jarkko Nieminen (hip injury)
  Édouard Roger-Vasselin (fatigue)

Doubles main-draw entrants

Seeds

 Rankings are as of September 22, 2014

Other entrants
The following pairs received wildcards into the doubles main draw:
  Tatsuma Ito /  Go Soeda
  Kei Nishikori /  Yasutaka Uchiyama

The following pair received entry from the qualifying draw:
  Jamie Delgado /  Gilles Müller

The following pair received entry as lucky losers:
  Pierre-Hugues Herbert /  Michał Przysiężny

Withdrawals
Before the tournament
  Jo-Wilfried Tsonga (stomach virus)

During the tournament
  Kei Nishikori (hip injury)

Champions

Singles

 Kei Nishikori defeated  Milos Raonic, 7–6(7–5), 4–6, 6–4

Doubles

 Pierre-Hugues Herbert /  Michał Przysiężny defeated  Ivan Dodig /  Marcelo Melo, 6–3, 6–7(3–7), [10–5]

References

External links 
 

Rakuten Japan Open Tennis Championships
Japan Open (tennis)
Rakuten Japan Open Tennis Championships
Rakuten Japan Open Tennis Championships
Rakuten Japan Open Tennis Championships
Rakuten Japan Open Tennis Championships